Donax is the scientific name of two genera of organisms and may refer to:

Donax (bivalve), a genus of clams in the family Donacidae
Donax (plant), a genus of plants in the family Marantaceae